The 2014 MyAFibStory.com 400 was a NASCAR Sprint Cup Series stock car race that was held on September 14, 2014, at Chicagoland Speedway in Joliet, Illinois. The race was 267 laps long, and it was the 27th race of the 2014 NASCAR Sprint Cup Series, and the first of the ten-race Chase for the Sprint Cup. For the second race in a row, Brad Keselowski won the race to take his fifth win of the season and the 16th of his career. Jeff Gordon finished second ahead of rookie Kyle Larson. Joey Logano, and Kevin Harvick rounded out the top five.

Previous week's race
Brad Keselowski led 383 (out of 400) laps on his way to his fourth win of the season at the Federated Auto Parts 400 at Richmond International Raceway. Keselowski stated in his post-race interview that he had "pinched myself once to make sure I wasn't dreaming. These are nights you don't forget as a driver and you live for", while stating that his car was "just flying" and that he "couldn't ask for a better way to enter the Chase than to win and take the first seed". Clint Bowyer finished third, and failed to overturn the points disadvantage he had, to make the Chase. Bowyer expressed disappointedly that it was "definitely frustrating not making that Chase, but like I said, when you do make the Chase, you want it to be for a championship, not just ride around in it".

Report

Background
Chicagoland Speedway is a  tri-oval speedway in Joliet, Illinois, southwest of Chicago. The speedway opened in 2001 and currently hosts NASCAR racing including the opening event in the Chase for the Sprint Cup. Until 2011, the speedway also hosted the Verizon IndyCar Series, recording numerous close finishes including the closest finish in IndyCar history. The speedway is owned and operated by International Speedway Corporation and located adjacent to Route 66 Raceway.

Entry list
The entry list for the MyAFibStory.com 400 was released on Monday, September 8, 2014 at 10:47 a.m. Eastern time. Forty-three drivers were entered for the race.

Practice

First practice

Qualifying
Due to heavy rain, qualifying was cancelled and thus, Busch won the pole based on the session's times. He stated that the practice session had "started out slow, but the guys did a real nice job on the M&M's Camry today to get us to where we needed to be". Ryan Newman joined Busch on the front row, while in third place, was Carl Edwards – who missed the front row by 0.003 seconds. Although disappointed to miss the front row, Edwards expressed that he hoped "this is a sign of things to come".

Starting lineup

Practice (post-qualifying)

Second practice
Kyle Larson was forced to go to a backup car after his primary car cut a left-front tire and hit the wall in turn two. As this change occurred after qualifying, it meant that Larson had to start the race from the rear of the field.

Final practice

Race

First half

Start

The race was scheduled to start at 2:16 p.m. Eastern time but started five minutes later when Kyle Busch led the field to the green. Busch held the lead for the first portion of the race, until Jeff Gordon took the lead on lap 29. Jamie McMurray took the lead from Gordon on lap 40, and held the lead until the first set of green flag pit stops during the race, when he ceded the lead to Brad Keselowski, on lap 46. Keselowski's stay out front was short-lived, as he pitted on lap 47, and the lead cycled back to McMurray. The first caution of the race came out at around quarter-distance, caused by debris in turn two. Kyle Busch won the race off pit road, and thus retook the lead from McMurray, for the restart on lap 73. Three laps after the restart, McMurray scraped the wall upon exiting turn 2, but was able to maintain position despite that.

Gordon retook the lead from Busch on lap 88, and held the lead until the race went under neutralized yellow flag conditions for the second time, on lap 99, after Ryan Newman's car cut a left-front tire, exiting turn 4. The layout of the Chicagoland Speedway meant that Newman was unable to hit pit road instantaneously after the blowout, necessitating the yellow flag. Prior to the yellow flag, Justin Allgaier also hit the wall, but was able to continue. McMurray led the field out of the pits, after he took only two tires at his pit stop. Under caution, the shifter handle on the No. 47 car of A. J. Allmendinger broke, akin to what happened to Jimmie Johnson at the Pure Michigan 400 the previous month. McMurray led to the restart on lap 105, but Keselowski retook the lead on lap 107.

Second half
Keselowski held the lead throughout the next stint, and only gave up the lead, to make a scheduled green flag pit stop, on lap 149. This gave the head of the race to Jimmie Johnson, but Johnson pitted the next lap to give the lead back to Keselowski. However, Kevin Harvick drove past Keselowski almost immediately thereafter, to take the lead for the first time in the race. Harvick held the lead until the next caution, the race's third, on lap 181. The caution came after a piece of energy absorbing foam from the SAFER barrier protection blocks had broken free. Keselowski came off pit road in second place behind Harvick, but had to make another stop for a missing lug nut, prior to the lap 187 restart. Kyle Larson took the lead from Harvick with 40 laps to go, before pitting a lap later, and passed the lead onto Aric Almirola.

Final laps
Almirola made his final stop as the caution came out with 37 laps to go after Carl Edwards' car cut down a left-rear tire, and Larson cycled back to the lead in the process. While pitting, Almirola blew his car's engine, and he retired from the race. Almirola later described himself as "heartbroken" with the result. The race restarted with 30 laps to go, but only ran for a handful of laps before Clint Bowyer brought out the fifth caution of the race, with 23 laps to go, after he hit the wall in turn 2. The race restarted with 18 laps to go, and Harvick retook the lead from Larson before Keselowski moved to the head of the race the following lap. The caution flags flew for the sixth time with ten laps to go after Ricky Stenhouse Jr. and Danica Patrick made contact on the front stretch. Upon exiting her car, Patrick stated that she "talked with Ricky afterward and we're fine". The race restarted with six laps to go and Brad Keselowski coasted on to victory lane, for his second successive win. Keselowski expressed his delight at the result, stating that he "was waiting for an opportunity to strike and it came. The car stuck and everything came together".

Race results

Race statistics
 18 lead changes among different drivers
 6 cautions for 28 laps
 Time of race: 2:48:50
 Brad Keselowski won his fifth race in 2014

Media

Television

Radio

Standings after the race

Drivers' Championship standings

Manufacturers' Championship standings

Note: Only the first sixteen positions are included for the driver standings.

Note

References

MyAFibStory.com 400
MyAFibStory.com 400
MyAFibStory.com 400
NASCAR races at Chicagoland Speedway